Michael Vaughn may refer to:
Michael G. Vaughn, American social work professor
Michael L. Vaughn (born 1957), Maryland politician
Michael Vaughn (Alias), a character from Alias